This is a list of transfers in the 2013 season of Singapore football.

Albirex Niigata (S)

In (Pre-Season)

Out (Pre-Season)

Balestier Khalsa

In (Pre-Season)

Out (Pre-Season)

Brunei DPMM

In (Pre-Season)

Out (Pre-Season)

Out (Mid-Season)

Courts Young Lions

In (Pre-Season)

Out (Pre-Season)

In (Mid-Season)

Out (Mid-Season)

Geylang International

In (Pre-Season)

Out (Pre-Season)

Home United

In (Pre-Season)

Out (Pre-Season)

Hougang United

In (Pre-Season)

Out (Pre-Season)

Tampines Rovers

In (Pre-Season)

Out (Pre-Season)

Out (Mid-Season)

Tanjong Pagar United

In (Pre-Season)

Out (Pre-Season)

Warriors F.C.

In (Pre-Season)

Out (Pre-Season)

Woodlands Wellington

In (Pre-Season)

Out (Pre-Season)

Out (Mid-Season)

Football transfers winter 2012–13
Football transfers summer 2013
2013 in Singaporean football
2013